Katherine Jane "Kate" Chase Sprague (August 13, 1840 – July 31, 1899) was a Washington society hostess during the American Civil War. During the war, she married Rhode Island Governor William Sprague.

She was the daughter of Ohio politician Salmon P. Chase, who served as Treasury Secretary during President Abraham Lincoln's first administration and later Chief Justice of the United States. She was a strong supporter of her widowed father's presidential ambitions which, had he been successful, would have made her acting First Lady.

Early life 
Kate was born in Cincinnati, Ohio, the daughter of Salmon Chase and his second wife Eliza Ann Smith.  Eliza Chase died shortly after Kate's fifth birthday; Chase later married Sara Bella Ludlow with whom Kate had a difficult relationship.

Kate Chase was educated at the Haines School in New York City, where she learned languages, elocution and the social graces along with music and history. After nine years of schooling, she returned to Columbus, Ohio, to serve as official hostess for her father, the newly elected Governor of Ohio, and by now widowed a third time. Beautiful and intelligent, Kate impressed such friends of her father as Charles Sumner, a Massachusetts senator and fellow anti-slavery champion; future President James Garfield; and Carl Schurz, a German-born American politician, who described her as follows:

She was about eighteen years old, tall and slender and exceedingly well formed.  . . .  Her little nose, somewhat audaciously tipped up, could perhaps not have passed muster with a severe critic, but it fitted pleasingly into her face with its large, languid, but at the same time vivacious hazel eyes, shaded by long dark lashes and arched over by proud eyebrows.  The fine forehead was framed in waving, gold-brown hair. She had something imperial in the pose of the head, and all her movements possessed an exquisite natural charm.  No wonder that she came to be admired as a great beauty and broke many hearts.  After the usual commonplaces, the conversation at the breakfast table, in which Miss Kate took a lively and remarkably intelligent part, soon turned itself upon politics.

Life in Washington 

In 1861, Salmon P. Chase became Secretary of the Treasury in Lincoln's administration. He set up residence at 6th and E Streets Northwest in Washington, with Kate Chase as his hostess. Her soirees were eagerly attended in the nation's capital; she became, effectively, the "Belle of the North."  She visited battle camps in the Washington area and befriended Union generals, offering her own views on the proper prosecution of the war, often contrary to the wishes of the administration.

Marriage and divorce 

She married Rhode Island Governor William Sprague, a textile magnate, on November 12, 1863 (the social event of the season) at Chase's home in Washington. Sprague's wedding gift to her was a tiara of matched pearls and diamonds that cost more than $50,000. As the bride entered the room, the U.S. Marine Band played "The Kate Chase March" that composer Thomas Mark Clark had written for the occasion. President Lincoln attended the reception, but his wife, who strongly disliked both of the Chases, did not.

They had four children: William (b. 1865), Ethel (b. 1869), Catherine (b. 1872) and Portia (b. 1873). Sprague had problems with alcohol, had affairs with other women, and lost huge sums of money in poorly conceived business ventures.  Some evidence suggests that he engaged in illegal cotton trading during the war.

Sprague was elected a U.S. Senator in 1863. During the 1868 impeachment trial of President Andrew Johnson, presided over by Chief Justice Salmon Chase, Sprague kept his intentions to himself, but ended up voting with most Republican senators for conviction. This may have furthered his rift with Kate, whose father's chances for the 1868 Republican Presidential nomination would have been damaged had Johnson been removed from office. Next in line to the Presidency, under the law at the time, was radical Republican President pro tempore of the U.S. Senate Benjamin Wade, who could have then run as an incumbent. Johnson was acquitted by a single vote.

The marriage ended in divorce in 1882.  Before the divorce, Kate was accused of having an affair with the flamboyant and powerful New York Senator Roscoe Conkling.  According to a well-known story, buttressed by contemporaneous press reports, Sprague confronted the philandering couple at Sprague's Rhode Island summer home and pursued Conkling with a shotgun and threatened to throw Kate out of a second story window. The shotgun incident with Conkling happened in 1879, but Kate was suspected of infidelities at least 10 years earlier. According to Salmon Chase biographer John Niven, "Whether [Kate's second] child...was Sprague's or had been conceived by another is a matter of speculation."

Willie Sprague continued to live with his father, while the daughters went with Kate Chase, who took back her maiden name after the divorce. Willie died at age 25 in a Seattle boarding house. He had already been through one marriage and divorce. His wife gave birth to a child of questionable lineage only six months after they were married.

Political action 
Kate worked behind the scenes to foster her father's calculated efforts to wrest the 1864 Republican Party nomination for President from Lincoln, but the plot blew up in Chase's face when it became public, requiring Chase to settle back into his Treasury Secretary position.  One of Chase's many perfunctory offers of resignation from the Cabinet was accepted by Lincoln (much to Chase's surprise and consternation) in 1864, but the President appointed Chase Chief Justice upon the death of Roger Taney that year.  The evidence conflicts as to whether Kate welcomed this prestigious appointment or rued it as an attempt to put her father "on the shelf" so as to preempt any hope of his attaining his most-cherished ambition for the highest office in the land.

Despite his position on the Supreme Court, Chase let it be known in 1868 that he was available as a candidate for the Presidency.  He switched parties from the Republicans (of whom he had been an important early member) to the Democrats, hoping they would nominate him.  In the summer of 1868, Kate ran her father's campaign for the Democratic nomination from their hotel on Fifth Avenue in New York City, where the convention was being held in famed Tammany Hall.  Although tradition prevented her appearance, as a woman, on the convention floor, she did much of the back-room maneuvering with the goal of winning the nomination after the first ballot.  At times the prize seemed within their grasp, but the convention ended up nominating Horatio Seymour, the Democratic Governor of New York, whom Kate and other Chase operatives had been counting on to place her father's name in nomination.  Kate placed the blame for the defeat on a conspiracy of New York politicians including Samuel Tilden.  Kate wrote her father after the convention, "You have been most cruelly deceived and shamefully used by the man [Tilden] whom you trusted implicitly and the country must suffer for his duplicity."  Kate would reputedly have her revenge on Tilden eight years later when her paramour Conkling, the most powerful member of the Senate, maneuvered to throw the disputed 1876 election to the Republican Rutherford B. Hayes over the Democrat Tilden, who had won the popular vote.

Chase would make one final bid for the presidency in 1872, with Kate's full support, but by then he was physically weakened and a political has-been; he ran as a Liberal Republican, challenging the incumbent Ulysses S. Grant.  The effort went nowhere and Chase died a year later, with Kate (and Sprague, her husband in name only) at his bedside.

Later years 
In 1873, following her father's death, Kate moved onto the "Edgewood" estate, which later became the neighborhood of Edgewood, Washington, D.C.; her father had purchased the bulk of the estate in 1863 and constructed a mansion on it.  She lived a very quiet life with her three daughters (according to the 1880 federal census), Ethel, Kitty, and Portia Sprague.  After her son Willie committed suicide in 1890, at the age of 25, Kate became a recluse. She eventually lost her fortune and, to get by, resorted to raising chickens, growing vegetables and selling them door to door. She died in poverty in 1899, at age 58, of Bright's disease and was buried at Spring Grove Cemetery in Cincinnati, Ohio.

On her death, The New York Times wrote that "the homage of the most eminent men in the country was hers." The Washington Post called her "the most brilliant woman of her day. None outshone her." The Cincinnati Enquirer, the paper of her birthplace, said about her funeral:

Hardly more than two or three—and they the nearest relatives on earth—were gathered together yesterday morning around the new-made grave in Spring Grove Cemetery, where, with the simple ceremony of commitment—"Dust to dust, ashes to ashes"—the mortal remains of the daughter of Salmon P. Chase were laid to rest forever beside the dust of her illustrious father.

And yet, The Enquirer recognized her legacy: "No Queen has ever reigned under the Stars and Stripes, but this remarkable woman came closer to being Queen than any American woman has."

Fictional portrayals
Kate Chase's presence in Washington, D.C. would be fictionally recreated in the 1990s TV series The Secret Diary of Desmond Pfeiffer. She is prominent in both Gore Vidal's historical novel Lincoln and William Safire's Freedom and is portrayed by Deborah Adair in the 1988 made-for-TV movie of Vidal's book.  Chase has also been featured in other Civil War-related novels, such as Stephen L. Carter's The Impeachment of Abraham Lincoln.

References

Further reading 
The Belle of Washington, by Eleanor Harper Shumaker
Kate Chase and William Sprague: Politics and Gender in a Civil War Marriage, by Peg A. Lamphier
Kate Chase for the Defense, by Alice Sokoloff
Kate Chase, Dominant Daughter: The Life Story of a Brilliant Woman and her Famous Father, by Mary Merwin Phelps
Proud Kate, Portrait of an Ambitious Woman, by Ishabel Ross
So Fell the Angels, The Story of Chase, Lincoln's ambitious Chief Justice, his bold designing daughter, and the husband who could finance her plans, by Thomas Graham Belden and Marva Robins Belden
 Lee's Lost Dispatch and Other Civil War Controversies, by Philip Leigh (Yardley, Penna.: Westholme Publishing, 2015), 214
Lincoln, by Gore Vidal - The author uses Kate Chase as a major character in his novel
Freedom by William Safire - Kate Chase appears in several chapters of this  novel
Two Moons, a novel by Thomas Mallon, includes a fictional account of the Kate Chase/Roscoe Conkling extramarital affair
Team of Rivals: The Political Genius of Abraham Lincoln by Doris Kearns Goodwin, who provides comprehensive biographical information about Kate Chase
Mrs. Lincoln's Rival by Jennifer Chiaverini 
American Queen: The Rise and Fall of Kate Chase Sprague: Civil War "Belle of the North" and Gilded Age Woman of Scandal, by John Oller

External links 
 Kate Chase, Washington Hostess During The Civil War
 

1840 births
1899 deaths
First Ladies and Gentlemen of Rhode Island
Women in the American Civil War
People of Ohio in the American Civil War
People of Rhode Island in the American Civil War
People from Cincinnati
Deaths from kidney disease
Burials at Spring Grove Cemetery